Lobariella sipmanii is a species of foliose lichen in the family Peltigeraceae. It is found in high-altitude páramo in Cundinamarca, Colombia.

Taxonomy
Lobariella sipmanii was formally described as a new species in 2011 by Bibiana Moncada, Luisa Betancourt, and Robert Lücking. The species epithet sipmanii honours the authors' colleague Harrie Sipman, "for his invaluable contributions to lichenology in the Neotropics".

Description
The upper surface of the thallus of Lobariella sipmanii is pale blue-grey and glaucous, while the lower surface is white to yellowish white with a whitish texture resembling a tomentum. The ascospores are hyaline, spindle-shaped (fusiform) to long and needle-shaped (acicular) with between 5 and 9 septa, and have dimensions of 55–115 by 4–5 μm. Lobariella sipmanii contains gyrophoric acid as its major lichen product in addition to smaller amounts of metabolically related satellite compounds.

Habitat and distribution
The predominant plants in this area are Diplostephium revolutum, and species of both Espeletia and Pentacalia. Other associates are the congener L. pallida, and mosses. The lichen is known from a few collections at the type locality.

References

Peltigerales
Lichen species
Lichens described in 2011
Lichens of Colombia
Taxa named by Robert Lücking